Special Groups (SGs) is a designation given by the United States military to the cell-based Shi'a paramilitary organizations operating within Iraq, backed by Iran. According to the United States these groups are funded, trained, and armed by the Iranian Quds Force, part of the Islamic Revolutionary Guard Corps (IRGC). According to the United States Department of Defense, 603 American troops in total were confirmed to have been killed by IRGC-backed Shia militias (Special Groups) during the Iraq War.

According to American General Kevin J. Bergner, the Special Groups receive between 750,000 and 3,000,000 dollars funding per month from the Quds Force. These groups are separate from but allied with the Mahdi Army of Muqtada al-Sadr. The distinction between these groups and the Mahdi Army became more clear when al-Sadr called for a ceasefire at the end of August 2007 following Mahdi Army clashes with Iraqi Security Forces in Karbala but the Special Groups continued fighting. After the Mahdi Army's disbandment in 2008, the Promised Day Brigades emerged as its successor; however, the largest special group to emerge after the Iraq spring fighting of 2008 was Asa'ib Ahl al-Haq (also known as the Qazali Network). According to the Guardian newspaper in March 2014, Asa'ib Ahl al-Haq was controlled by Iran under Quds Force General Qasem Soleimani, who was killed in 2020. Another large special group is Kata'ib Hezbollah (or Hezbollah Brigades) which started to operate independently from the Mahdi Army and the other Special Groups. Suspected leaders include Qais al-Khazali, Laith al-Khazali, Ali al-Lami, Azhar al-Dulaimi, Akram al-Kaabi, Abu Mustafa al-Sheibani, Abu Mahdi al-Muhandis and Abu Deraa.

History
Ever since the Islamic Revolution, Iran has sought to back Shia Islamist paramilitary organizations across the Middle East. Many have been very close to the Iranian state, particularly the Islamic Revolutionary Guard Corps, like the Movement of Vanguard Missionaries and the Supreme Council for Islamic Revolution in Iraq (SCIRI). During the Iran–Iraq War many of these groups fought for Iran, with SCIRI's Badr Brigade being led by Iranian officers. After the US overthrow of Saddam Hussein, these Iranian-led militia men returned to Iraq where they retained their autonomy and Iran continued to support Shia Islamist paramilitaries.

In February 2010, Asaib Ahl al-Haq kidnapped U.S. contractor Issa T. Salomi, a naturalized American from Iraq. They released a video of him where he read their demands, calling for the release of all the group's members, including several of the group's leaders who were imprisoned. He was released in March 2010 in exchange for four AAH militants being held in Iraqi custody. Iran is supporting three Shiite extremist groups in Iraq that have been attempting to attack American bases, General Ray Odierno, the top U.S. commander in Iraq, said on July 21, 2010. The Iranians have "gone to a more sophisticated program with a smaller set of extremists" and are now focusing on three groups, which he identified as Kataib Hezbollah, Asaib Ahl al-Haq (League of the Righteous), and the Promised Day Brigade.

As of 2011, according to American officials, the Promised Day Brigades is the largest, with over 5,000 fighters, and pose the biggest long-term security threat to Iraq. Kata'ib Hezbollah is said to have around 1,000 fighters and is the most exclusively reliant on Iranian support. Asa'ib al-Haq is said to have less than 1,000 fighters as of 2011 and receives a reported 5 million per month in Iranian funding. The Promised Day Brigades is said to receive the least amount of Iranian funding and is the most independent of the three.

Since the beginning of the Iraqi war against ISIS, the Special Groups have joined the Popular Mobilization Forces to fight against the Islamic State of Iraq and the Levant.

Leaders

See also
 Harakat Hezbollah al-Nujaba
 Kata'ib Sayyid al-Shuhada
 Kata'ib al-Imam Ali
 Jaysh al-Mu'ammal
 Liwa Assad Allah
 Hezbollah (Lebanon)
 Hezbollah al-Hejaz (Saudi Arabia)
 Liwa Fatemiyoun (Syria)
 Liwa Zainebiyoun (Syria)
 Harakah al-Sabireen (Palestine)
 Islamic Movement (Nigeria)

References

External links

 Coalition forces target Special Groups leader, 49 criminals killed – 21 Oct 2007
 Raid in Baghdad's Sadr City kills 49 Special Groups operatives – 21 Oct 2007
 DoD News Briefing with Maj. Gen. Sherlock from the Pentagon – 04 Oct 2007
 Cooling The Clash With Iran – 16 Sep 2007
 Gen. Petraeus Opening Remarks to Congress – 11 Sep 2007
 Two Suspected Secret Cell Terrorists Detained by Coalition Forces – 12 Jul 2007
 MNF-I spokesman details secret cell involvement in Iraq – 02 Jul 2007
  – 15 Nov 2008
 
  – 26 Apr 2009
 Special Groups training
 Recent Attacks in Iraq: Al-Qaeda in Iraq or Special Groups?

Arab militant groups
Factions in the Iraq War
Iraqi insurgency (2003–2011)
Paramilitary forces of Iraq
Rebel groups in Iraq
Resistance movements
Shia organizations
Anti-Americanism
2007 establishments in Iraq